St George Orthodox Koonan Kurishu Old Syrian Church, is situated in Mattancherry, Kochi and belongs to the Malankara Orthodox Syrian Church. The church was constructed at the site of the historic Leaning Cross Oath (Koonan Kurish Sathyam) by Bishop Shakrulla Mar Baselios a Syriac Orthodox Bishop   in AD 1751. The Church is dedicated to St George (Geevarghese Sahada) and the Holy relics of St George is  installed in the Holy Sanctuary.

This church is also known as "Mattancherry Muri" or "Erimeghapally" or "Mattancherry Church", and is the oldest St George Church in Kochi. Considering the historic importance of this Church as the site of the Oath,Malankara Orthodox Syrian Church declared it as a historic monument and well as a pilgrim center.

Timings of Liturgy at Koonan Kurishu Old Syrian Church
The Holy Qurbana is conducted at Koonan Kurishu Church on all Fridays and Sundays.

The offering of Neyyappam by devotees for 'favours received' and 'prayers heard' is a custom here.

References

Churches in Kochi
Malankara Orthodox Syrian church buildings
Mattancherry